Saša Zimonjić (Serbian Cyrillic: Саша Зимоњић; born 9 April 1978) is a Serbian former professional footballer.

Statistics

External links
 Saša Zimonjić at LevskiSofia.info
 
 
 

Association football midfielders
Expatriate footballers in Bosnia and Herzegovina
Expatriate footballers in Bulgaria
Expatriate footballers in Greece
Expatriate footballers in Sweden
FK Borac Čačak players
FK Obilić players
FK Slavija Sarajevo players
FK Železnik players
Mjällby AIF players
Panionios F.C. players
Sportspeople from Čačak
PFC Levski Sofia players
Serbia and Montenegro under-21 international footballers
Serbian expatriate footballers
Serbian footballers
1978 births
Living people